Petar Đurković (Петар Ђурковић, 1908–1981) was a Serbian astronomer known for discovering two asteroids in 1936 and 1940, respectively. One is named for the Serbian scientist Milutin Milanković, the other for Zvezdara, the hill in Belgrade where the Belgrade Astronomical Observatory is located.

Asteroid 1555 Dejan, discovered by Fernand Rigaux, was named after Đurković's son.

References 
 

1908 births
1981 deaths
20th-century astronomers
Discoverers of asteroids

Serbian astronomers
University of Belgrade Faculty of Philosophy alumni